The Jacaranda is a Liverpool music venue closely associated with the rise of the Merseybeat phenomenon in the 1960s. Opened by The Beatles' first manager Allan Williams in 1958, it played a key role in launching the band's early careers, in addition to providing a stage for local acts like Gerry and the Pacemakers & Rory Storm and The Hurricanes. The headquarters of independent record label Jacaranda Records and still operating as a live music venue, record store and bar, the club has occupied a place in Liverpool's music scene for over 60 years.

History 
Local promoter and businessman Williams opened The Jacaranda in September 1958 in a former watch-repair shop at 21 Slater Street, Liverpool, attracting a youthful clientele with an establishment offering one of the city's first espresso machines, an American style jukebox, and live music.

He named the venue The Jacaranda, after an exotic species of ornamental flowering tree, Jacaranda mimosifolia.

The venue, known affectionately as "The Jac", quickly became a central spoke of the Liverpool music scene, with Williams' friend and sometime business partner, the Trinidadian calypso singer, songwriter and music promoter Lord Woodbine, occupying a nightly residency slot and providing a focal point for many young local musicians.

Described by Williams in The Man Who Gave The Beatles Away as "The Black Hole of Calcutta set to music", The Jacaranda's cramped basement provided the UK with one of its first truly multicultural venues, bringing together a mixed audience of immigrants, bohemians and students to enjoy a blend of musical acts that ranged from calypso and steel drum acts to an emerging generation of Rock and roll bands. It was also to become the gateway to international attention for many local artists, with Williams organising a series of tours of Hamburg for several acts including Derry and the Seniors following a successful pathfinding visit by Woodbine in 1960.

Among those who became Jacaranda regulars were John Lennon, Paul McCartney, George Harrison & Stuart Sutcliffe, who approached Williams for a chance to rehearse and perform in the venue. As a part of the deal, the future Beatles were able to use the basement as a rehearsal studio during the day in return for redecorating the performance space, where Sutcliffe & Lennon's restored murals can still be seen today.

The Jacaranda became a key base for the band. It was there that Lennon wrote one of his earliest songs, One After 909, with the group playing several performances as The Silver Beetles and also using the venue to audition drummers including Pete Best. Leaving the club in a van driven by Lord Woodbine and Williams for a career-defining first tour of Hamburg in 1961, it was also the venue where the act first announced changing its name to The Beatles.

Even after the relationship with Williams ended, The Beatles recruited the drummer of Jacaranda regulars Rory Storm and the Hurricanes' - soon to be known as Ringo Starr - to replace Best and ultimately signed another frequent club visitor Brian Epstein as the manager who would take them on to global fame.

Present Day 
The Jacaranda remains an operational record label, music venue, bar and record store to this day, hosting nightly live performances, and focusing on newer artists.

In 2006, The Jacaranda was awarded a Pubs in Time plaque by the Campaign for Real Ale (Camra) for its role in the formative years of the Beatles.

In September 2019, Jacaranda Records announced that the building's top floor had been converted into the UK's first music-specific immersive audio studio.

References 

1958 establishments in England
The Beatles
Liverpool